Farallon de Medinilla , also known as No'os, is a small uninhabited island in the Northern Mariana Islands in the Pacific Ocean. Politically, it is part of the Northern Islands Municipality.

History

Europeans first charted Farallon de Medinilla in late September or early October 1543 by Spanish explorer Bernardo de la Torre commanding the carrack  during a failed attempt to find a northern route east from the Philippines to Mexico. Uninhabited at the time, later archaeological investigations have found blackened caves and pottery fragments indicating prior habitation by the Chamorros.  The island was visited by Louis de Freycinet in 1819; it was named for Don Jose de Medinilla y Pifieda, the Spanish Governor of the Marianas from 1812-1822.

Spain ceded Farallón de Medinilla to Germany through the German–Spanish Treaty (1899), together with the rest of the Mariana Islands (except Guam). The formalities of cession were carried out on November 17, 1899, in Saipan, for all the Northern Mariana Islands.

Following the sale of the Northern Marianas by Spain to the German Empire in 1899, Farallon de Medinilla was administered as part of German New Guinea. During World War I, the island came under the control of the Empire of Japan and was subsequently administered as part of the South Seas Mandate. Following World War II, the island came under the control of the United States and was administered as part of the Trust Territory of the Pacific Islands. Since 1978, the island has been part of the Northern Islands Municipality of the Commonwealth of the Northern Mariana Islands.

For years, the U.S. Navy has used Farallon de Medinilla for military and bombing exercises. In a 2002 lawsuit, the Center for Biological Diversity charged the Navy with destroying wildlife habitat on the island. A subsequent court ruling ordered the U.S. Defense Department to cease bombing exercises on Farallon de Medinilla until they came in compliance with the Migratory Bird Treaty Act.

Negative impacts of military activities on local fauna and flora, including terrestrial and oceanic species, have been pointed out. These include such as Micronesian megapodes, migratory birds and cetaceans such as boobies, terns, frigatebirds, humpback whales and false killer whales.

Geography

The shores are rimmed with cliffs containing caves and its tableland has some brush and savanna grass.

Satellite imagery (e.g., Google Earth) of the island shows three X-shaped figures and one Y-shaped figure in its northern half, built out of metal shipping containers. The U.S. Navy left these arrangements of shipping containers for bomb targeting practice.

References
 Russell E. Brainard et al.: Coral reef ecosystem monitoring report of the Mariana Archipelago: 2003–2007. (=PIFSC Special Publication, SP-12-01) NOAA Fisheries, Pacific Islands Fisheries Science Center 2012

Notes

Former German colonies
Islands of the Northern Mariana Islands
Coral islands
Uninhabited islands of the Northern Mariana Islands